Ulrich III may refer to:

 Ulrich III, Duke of Carinthia ( – 1269)
 Ulrich III, Count of Württemberg (after 1286 – 1344)
 Ulrich III, Lord of Hanau ( – )
 Ulrich III of Mecklenburg-Güstrow (1527–1603)